was a Japanese magazine published monthly by ASCII Media Works (formerly MediaWorks) publishing information mainly on adult visual novels. The magazine started as a special issue of the now discontinued Dengeki Oh in 1997, and in 2001 it became its own entity. Originally, it held information on boys love series but eventually shifted to adult visual novels when Dengeki Girl's Style began hosting the former content. Its sister magazine is Dengeki G's Magazine which publishes similar information of visual novels. Starting in the April 2007 issue, the title of the magazine was written in all capitals.

The magazine was discontinued on December 27, 2014. The magazine's official website ceased operation on April 2, 2018, which was announced on Twitter, as well as for a brief period of time on the website itself.

Reader participation projects
Maid in Dream, ran between volume 7 and December 2003
Ocha Para Ocha no Mizu Onago Gakuen, ran between April 2001 and May 2005
Master of Witches: Gekidō!! Mahō Gakuen, ran between June 2004 and August 2005
G Baku-chan, ran between October 2004 and July 2006
Colorfull Education, started December 2005
Kimi ni Okuru Boku no Uta, started December 2005

References

External links
 

1997 establishments in Japan
2014 disestablishments in Japan
ASCII Media Works magazines
Defunct magazines published in Japan
Magazines established in 1997
Magazines disestablished in 2014
Magazines published in Tokyo
MediaWorks magazines
Monthly manga magazines published in Japan
Video game magazines published in Japan